Nile Township is one of the sixteen townships of Scioto County, Ohio, United States.  The 2010 census found 2,388 people in the township.

Geography
Located in the southwestern corner of the county along the Ohio River, it borders the following townships:
Brush Creek Township - north
Union Township - northeast
Washington Township - east
Green Township, Adams County - west
Jefferson Township, Adams County - northwest
Lewis County, Kentucky lies across the Ohio River to the south.

No municipalities are located in Nile Township, although the unincorporated community of Friendship lies in the township's boundaries.

Shawnee State Forest covers much of Nile Township as well as neighboring Washington Township.

It has the greatest area of any township in the county.

Name and history
Nile Township was organized August 9, 1803. The township takes its name from the Nile river in Egypt. It is the only Nile Township statewide.

Government
The township is governed by a three-member board of trustees, who are elected in November of odd-numbered years to a four-year term beginning on the following January 1. Two are elected in the year after the presidential election and one is elected in the year before it. There is also an elected township fiscal officer, who serves a four-year term beginning on April 1 of the year after the election, which is held in November of the year before the presidential election. Vacancies in the fiscal officership or on the board of trustees are filled by the remaining trustees.

Education
Township residents are served by the Washington-Nile Local School District.

References

External links
County website
 Washington-Nile Local School District

Townships in Scioto County, Ohio
Townships in Ohio